The Life Guards was the senior formation of the King of France's Household Cavalry within the Maison militaire du roi de France.

History

Foundation
The oldest unit in the Garde du Corps was the Company of Scottish Archers, later just the 1st Scottish Company or Garde Écossaise, formed in 1419 from Scots that fought for the French during Hundred Years' War. This unit was created at an uncertain date between 1423 and 1448. Subsequently, two further French companies were raised. A final company was established on 17 March 1515. Each of the four companies initially numbered less than a hundred men.

Active service
In the Battle of Fornovo during the Italian Wars the Garde du Corps saved king Charles VIII from being captured by enemy forces. Later in the Italian Wars they failed to save Francis I from being captured in the Battle of Pavia.

The last time the Garde du Corps campaigned was during the War of the Austrian Succession because it only went on campaign when the king was present. The last battle in which the Garde du Corps was present was Lauffeld on 1 July 1747.

Composition and military quality
In contrast to other units of the Royal Household such as the French Guards and the Swiss Guards, the Garde du Corps was an exclusively aristocratic corps. Even the rank and file were drawn from families with appropriate social backgrounds. As such they were noted for their courtly manners but less so for their professionalism and military skills.
 Individual courtier guardsmen stationed at Versailles were not subject to regular training beyond ceremonial drill, and extended periods of leave from duty were common. A critical report, dated 1775, concluded that the Body Guard and other "distinguished units with their own privileges are always very expensive - fight less than line troops, are usually badly disciplined and badly trained, and are always very embarrassing on campaign". Officers of the Garde du Corps resented having to wear uniforms (perceived as a form of servant livery) when on duty at Versailles and eventually won the concession of appearing in civilian court dress with their military belts and swords, except when on parade.

Revolution and Restoration
The Garde du Corps featured conspicuously in several incidents in the opening stages of the French Revolution. On 1 October 1789 the officers of the Garde hosted a banquet to welcome their colleagues of the Régiment de Flandre (Flanders Regiment); a line infantry regiment of the Royal Army, which had been brought to Versailles to replace the disbanded Gardes Francais (French Guards). The latter regiment had joined in the attack on the Bastille six weeks before. The banquet was reported in Paris as a royalist provocation and an angry crowd of thousands marched on Versailles. During the night of 5 October about 500 members of the crowd broke into the Palace, killing two of the Gardes du Corps on duty. Other Gardes du Corps held the doors to the royal apartments until grenadiers of the National Guard – mostly former Gardes Francais – restored order. The Garde du Corps narrowly escaped massacre and, disarmed, was obliged to accompany the Royal Family to Paris. Most of this aristocratic regiment then dispersed to their estates or into exile.           

The Garde du Corps was formally dissolved in 1791 along with all of the Maison du Roi, except for the ill-fated Swiss Guards. After the abdication of Napoleon I in April 1814 and the Bourbon Restoration, Louis XVIII recreated the Garde du Corps with the rest of the Maison du Roi. These units disappeared during Napoleon's return, at the start of the Hundred Days.

After Waterloo and the return of the Bourbons the Garde du Corps was recreated again, almost the only unit of the old Maison du Roi to be given a further chance after the disappointing performance of these expensive and militarily obsolete regiments in 1815. The Garde du Corps was however reorganised, reduced in numbers to about 1,500 and integrated more closely with the regular army. The reconstituted Garde du Corps served the returned Bourbons loyally until being finally abolished, along with all Guard units, by Louis-Philippe in 1830 after the July Revolution.

Motto
The original motto of the Garde du Corps was Erit haec quoque cognita monstris (They will be recognized, them also, with their brilliant deeds), but during the reign of Louis XIV it changed to Nec pluribus impar (No unequal match for many (suns)), which also was Louis XIV's personal motto.

The swords of the guardsmen were inscribed with Vive le Roi (Long live the King).

Organization
The number of guardsmen increased between the reign of Francis I and that of Louis XIV from 400 to 1,600 men. In the eighteenth century, the numbers eventually stabilized at around 1,500 men.

In 1737, each company had 320 men, organized into two squadrons and six brigades.

1st Scottish Company (Garde Écossaise)

Despite the name, by the 16th century the company had ceased to be purely Scottish. Little by little the Scottish Company became Scottish in name only.

Captains/Chefs de corps:
 1440 : Robert Patilloch
 1449 : Mathieu d'Harcourt, Lord of Rugny
 1455 : Claude de Châteauneuf, Garde-du-Corps of Charles VII of France
 1456 : Michel de Beauvilliers, seigneur de La Ferte-Hubert, du Lude et de Thoury
 1462 : William Stuyers
 1466 : Thomas Stuyers
 1471 : Geffrey Coowran
 1473 : Robert Coningham
 1480 : Jean Coningham
 1495-1508 : Bernard Stewart (1452-1508), Duke of Aubigny
 1508-1512 : John Stewart ( † 1512), seigneur d'Henrichemont
 1512 : Robert Stewart (1570-1544), Duke of Aubigny, Maréchal de France (1515)
 1514-1544 : Jean Stuart ( † 1551), sieur de Vézinnes et de Fontaine
 1544 : Jacques I de Montgomery (vers 1485–1560), seigneur de Lorges
 1557 : Gabriel I de Montgommery (vers 1530–1574), seigneur de Lorges
 1559 : Jacques II de Montgommery ( † 1562), seigneur de Lorges
 1562-1563 : Jean d'O (vers 1510-vers 1578), seigneur de Maillebois
 1563-1569 : Jean de Losse, écuyer, seigneur de Bannes
 1569-1599 : Joachim de Châteauvieux (1545-1615), Governor of the Bastille
 1599-1605 : Jean-Paul d'Esparbès de Lussan ( † 1616), seigneur de La Serre, chevalier du Saint-Esprit
 1605-1611 : Antoine Arnaud de Pardaillan de Gondrin (1562-1624), marquis de Montespan, chevalier du Saint-Esprit
 1611-1612 : Philibert de Nerestang ( † 1620), marquis de Nerestang
 1612-1616 : Charles d'Estournel, seigneur de Blainville
 1616-1623 : Charles de La Vieuville (1583-1653), marquis de de La Vieuville
 1623-1642 : Guillaume de Simiane ( † 1642), marquis de Gordes (février 1615), chevalier du Saint-Esprit ;
 1642-1642 : François de Simiane (vers 1622–1680), marquis de Gordes
 1642-1651 : François de Rochechouart (1611-1696), comte de Limoges (1661), marquis de Chandenier
 1651 : Anne de Noailles (1620-1678), Duke of Noailles
 1678 : Anne Jules de Noailles (1650-1708), comte d'Ayen, Duke of Noailles, Maréchal de France (1693)
 1707 : Adrien Maurice de Noailles (1678-1766), Duke of Noailles, Maréchal de France (1734)
 1731 : Louis de Noailles (1713-1793), Duke of Ayen, Duke of Noailles, Maréchal de France (1775)
 1758-1791 : Jean-Paul de Noailles (1739-1824), Duke of Ayen, Duke of Noailles
 1814-1825 : Joseph Anne Maximilien de Croÿ d'Havré (1744-1839)
 1825-1830 : Emmanuel Marie Maximilien de Croÿ-Solre (1768-1848)

2nd Company (1st French Company)

Louis XI, by edict of 4 September 1474, had instituted for the custody of his person a company of 100 French men-at-arms, under the command of Hector de Galard. This troop was for a long time known under the nickname of gentilshommes au bec de corbin, because they carried a balanced ax on its handle by a bent tip.

Each of these gentlemen was to maintain at his own expense two archers. By letters patent given at Rouen on 10 June 1475, the King exempted these gentlemen from the maintenance of the archers; he took them in his pay and formed a special company, which he entrusted to Jean Blosset, Lord of Plessis-Pate. This company of archers was called la petite garde du roi, to distinguish it from the 1st Company (Scottish Guard) which was officially designated under the title of Cent lances des gentilshommes de l’hôtel du Roy, ordered for the guard his person, that is, his escort.

The petite garde served on foot and horseback.

It is this petite garde, transformed by Francis I in the company of 100 men-at-arms, which became in 1515, the 1st French Company of the Garde-du-Corps. This company distinguished itself from others, from the reign of Louis XIV, by the blue color of its banners and shoulder straps.

The company held quarters at Coulommiers and served at Versailles the quarter of April.

Captains/Chefs de corps:
 1474 : Hector de Galard de Brassac (1415-1475), chambellan de Louis XI
 1475 : Jean Blosset du Plessis-Pâté († avant 1500), baron de Torcy
 1477 : Hervé de Chalnay
 1482 : Jacques de Silly (1450-1503), seigneur de Launay et de Vaulx, chambellan de Charles VIII, bailli et capitaine de Caen, grand maître de l'artillerie de France
 1482 : Jacques Ier de Crussol, vicomte d'Uzès
 1524 : Louis II Mitte de Miolans de Chevrières († 1529), seigneur de Chevrières, sénéchal du Bourbonnais (1525), et bailli de Gévaudan (1528)
 1530 : Antoine de Raffin, seigneur de Puycalvary, de Beaucaire et d'Azay-le-Rideau, Governor of Cherbourg, Marmande and La Sauvetat
 1551 : Louis de Talaru, seigneur de Chalmazel
 1570 : Eustache de Conflans, vicomte d'Ouchy (vers 1526–1574), Governor of Saint-Quentin, chevalier du Saint-Esprit, distinguished at Surprise of Meaux and Battle of Saint-Denis (1567)
 1574 : Nicolas d'Angennes (1533-1611), marquis de Rambouillet, vidame du Mans, chevalier du Saint-Esprit
 1580 : Jean d'O, seigneur de Manou, chevalier du Saint-Esprit
 1595 : Louis de L'Hospital († 1611), marquis de Vitry, chevalier du Saint-Esprit
 1611 : Nicolas de L'Hospital, marquis de Vitry
 1617 : François de L'Hospital, marquis du Hallier
 1631 : Charles de Lévis-Charlus (1600-1662), marquis de Château-Renault
 1634 : Louis de Béthune (1605-1681), Duke of Chârost (1672), maréchal de camp, lieutenant-général des ville et citadelle de Calais, chevalier du Saint-Esprit
 1648 : René du Plessis de Jarzé, marquis de Jarzé (1613-1676), le Beau Jarzé
 1649 : Louis de Béthune (1605-1681), Duke of Chârost
 1663 : Louis Armand de Béthune-Chârost (1640-1717), Duke of Chârost, chevalier du Saint-Esprit.
 1672 : Jacques Henri de Durfort de Duras (1652-1704), Duke of Duras, Maréchal de France, chevalier du Saint-Esprit
 1704 : Louis-François de Boufflers (1644-1711), Duke of Boufflers
 1711 : Armand I de Béthune-Chârost (1663-1747), Duke of Chârost, baron d'Ancenis
 1747 : Paul François de Béthune-Chârost (1682-1759), Duke of Chârost
 1756 : Gaston Pierre de Lévis (1699-1757), Duke of Mirepoix
 1757 : Charles Juste de Beauvau, Prince of Craon (1720-1793), prince de Beauvau
 1784 : Philippe Louis de Noailles (1752-1819), prince de Poix, Duke of Mouchy
 1790 : Charles-Anne des Escotais (1772-1822), comte des Escotais

3rd Company (2nd French Company)

Louis XI, satisfied with the services of his petits gardes of the 1st French Company, created in 1479 a second similar company, and gave the command to Claude de La Chatre.

It became, like the previous one, a company of bodyguards at the beginning of the reign of Francis I.

Captains/Chefs de corps:
 1479 : Claude de La Châtre de Nançay, seigneur de Nançay
 1490 : Abel de La Châtre
 1499 : Gabriel de La Châtre, baron de La Maisonfort, seigneur de Nançay
 1529 : Joachim de La Châtre, baron de La Maisonfort
 1549 : François, seigneur de La Ferté, gentilhomme ordinaire de la Chambre du Roi
 ???? : Gaspard de La Châtre (vers 1539–1576), seigneur de Nançay
 1580 : Charles de Balzac (vers 1565–1610), baron d’Entragues
 1590 : François du Plessis, seigneur de Richelieu (1548-1590), Provost Marshal of France, conseiller d'État
 1590 : Charles de Choiseul, marquis de Praslin (1563-1626), Maréchal de France
 1611: René Potier (1579-1670), Duke of Tresmes
 1635 : Louis Potier de Gesvres (1612-1645), marquis de Gesvres
 1643 : François Potier de Gesvres (1612-1646), marquis de Gesvres
 1646 : Léon Potier (vers 1620–1704), Duke of Gesvres
 Lauzun, who lost in 1669 the position of Colonel General of the Dragoons, received that of captain of this company, thanks to the support (or the passion which it devotes to him) of Anne Marie Louise d'Orléans, Duchess of Montpensier, who not only obtained the approval of the King, but paid this charge 750,000 livres to the  Duke of Gesvres.
 1646 : Antoine Nompar de Caumont (1633-1723), Duke of Lauzun
 1673 : François-Henri de Montmorency (1628-1695), Duke of Piney, Maréchal de France
 1693 : François de Neufville (1664-1730), Duke of Villeroy, Maréchal de France
 1708 : Louis Nicolas de Neufville (1663-1734), Duke of Villeroy
 1734 : Louis François Anne de Neufville (1695-1766), Duke of Villeroy
 1758 : Gabriel Louis François de Neufville (1731-1794), Duke of Villeroy
 1791-1830 : Antoine-Louis-Marie de Gramont (1755-1836), Duke of Gramont

4th Company (3rd French Company)

Upon his accession to the throne, Francis I possessed a company which was commanded by a lieutenant-captain, Raoul de Vernon, Lord of Montreuilbouyn. He also had a personal guard commanded by Louis Leroy de Chavigny. Wishing to have five companies of the bodyguards, all organized on the foot of the Scottish company, he transformed in 1515, as it was said above, the two companies of archers of the small guard of Louis XI, and added two others trained with his personal guards and with detachments of companies of archers of Crussol and La Chatre.

In 1545 he remodeled the organization of the bodyguards, and he kept only four companies. The 4th company had its yellow flags, shoulder straps and crews. She served the Court from October 1 to December 31, and was usually quartered in Dreux.

Captains/Chefs de corps:
 1553 : Louis d'Humières de Contay
 1557 : Philippe de Maillé-Brézé, vicomte de Verneuil
 1575 : Nicolas de La Haulle, seigneur de Grémonville
 1592 : Jacques-Nompar de Caumont, Duke of La Force
 1632-1651 : Antoine d'Aumont de Rochebaron, Duke of Aumont, marquis de Villequier, Captain of the Gardes-du-Corps of Louis XIII
 1651-1669 : Louis Marie Victor d'Aumont de Rochebaron, Duke of Aumont, marquis de Villequier, Captain of the Gardes-du-Corps of Louis XIV
 1669-1675 : Henri Louis d'Aloigny, marquis de Rochefort, Captain of the Garde-du-Corps of Louis XIV
 1676-1696 : Guy Aldonce II de Durfort, comte de Lorges, Duke of Quintin, Maréchal de France (1676)
 1696-1702 : Guy Nicolas de Durfort, Duke of Lorges
 1703-1718 : Henry d'Harcourt, Duke of Harcourt
 1718-1750 : François d'Harcourt, Duke of Harcourt
 1750-1764 : Charles II Frédéric de Montmorency, Duke of Piney-Luxembourg
 1764-1784 : Charles François Christian de Montmorency-Luxembourg, prince de Tingry
 1784-1790 : Anne Paul Emmanuel Sigismond de Montmorency-Luxembourg, prince de Luxembourg
 1790-1790 : Anne Christian de Montmorency-Luxembourg, Duke of Beaumont
 1815 : Pierre Louis François Paultre de Lamotte (1774-1840), maréchal de camp, commandant of the 4th Company of the Gardes-du-Corps (Luxembourg)

Gardes de la Manche
The Gardes de la Manche was an elite detachment formed as the king's personal guard by Charles VII with men from the Company of Scottish Archers.  They were the 24 oldest men of the 1st Scottish Company. The name came from the fact that they stood so close to the king as to be brushed by his sleeves. In 1775 this guard was reduced to 18 men. The captain of the Garde de La Marche was called the First Man-at-arms of France.

A less successful bodyguard was The Forty-Five, recruited by the Duke of Épernon to provide Henry III of France with protection in the midst of the War of the Three Henrys.  They served Henry III and Henry IV of France, but were unable to prevent both monarchs being assassinated.

Gallery

References

Sources

Chartrand, René. Louis XIV's Army. London: Osprey Publishing, 1988. 
Chartrand, René. Louis XV's Army (1) Cavalry & Dragoons. London: Osprey Publishing, 1996. 
Philip Mansel. Pillars of Monarchy. London: Quartet Books 1984. 

1440 establishments in Europe
1440s establishments in France
Royal guards
Guards regiments of France
 
Bodyguards
1791 disestablishments in France
1814 establishments in France
1830 disestablishments in France
Guard regiments of the Ancien Régime

de:Garde du Corps